Ashley Vesci (born July 12, 1993) is an American ice hockey player. Vesci played professionally for the Buffalo Beauts of the National Women's Hockey League (NWHL) during the 2016/17 season.

Personal life 
Born and raised in Pittsburgh, PA where she currently resides.

Career
During college, Vesci played four seasons for Robert Morris University in College Hockey America. Vesci captained the team in her senior year during the 2015/16 season.

NWHL
In August 2016, the Buffalo Beauts announced that Vesci was one of six players signed to practice player contracts for the team in their 2016/17 season. Vesci made her professional debut for the NWHL shortly after.

Vesci won the 2017 Isobel Cup with the Buffalo Beauts, with an assist on a goal by Emily Janiga during the playoffs. Vesci retired from professional ice hockey after the 2016/17 season.

Career statistics

NCAA

National Women's Hockey League (NWHL)

References

External links
 

1993 births
American women's ice hockey forwards
Buffalo Beauts players
Living people
Robert Morris Colonials women's ice hockey players